Generation K may refer to:

 Generation K (baseball)
 Generation K (demographics)